Ricardo Montero may refer to:
Ricardo Montero (referee) (born 1979), Costa Rican football referee
Ricardo Montero (cyclist) (1902–1974), Spanish racing cyclist
Ricardo Montero Allende (born 1963), Chilean biologist and politician 
Ricardo Montero Duque (born 1925), Cuban military commander